Sir Henry de Grey of Grays Thurrock, Essex (1155–1219) was a favourite courtier of King John of England.

Family
Sir Henry was the son of John de Grey (born Thurrock, Essex, c. 1140 and married c. 1157) and probably a great-grandson of Anchetil de Greye (b. circa 1100) of Rotherfield Greys, a grandson of Domesday baron Anchetil de Greye (c. 1052 – 1086+). Sir Henry was the progenitor of the considerable number of noble houses bearing the name Grey or Gray; Sir Henry's descendants in the direct male line went on to be ennobled with no less than eighteen peerages, including eleven substantive baronies, a viscountcy, four earldoms (Kent, Tankerville, Stamford and Grey), a marquessate and two duchies. Sir Henry's descendants through the female line are countless but include the Barons Audley, Barons Revelstoke, Barons Northbrook, Barons Howick, Barons Dacre, Barons Willoughby de Eresby, Earl of Lindsey, the Earls of Malmesbury, Earls of Westmoreland, Earls of Essex, Earls of Durham, Earls of Cromer, Earls of Elgin, Earls of Bridgewater, the Earls of Ashburnham, the Marquesses of Lindsey and the Dukes of Somerset, the Dukes of Ancaster, and the Aga Khans, amongst many others.

Life
In 1195 he had been granted the Manor of Thurrock in Essex which later became known as Grays Thurrock (or simply Grays), which he bought from Isaac the Jew and his son Josce. To commemorate this connection, on 11 June 2013 (the 808th anniversary of the charter), a green Thurrock heritage plaque was unveiled to de Grey. Before 1201 he was also granted the Manor of Codnor, Derbyshire, and in 1216 was also granted by King Henry III of England the Manor of Grimston in Nottinghamshire.

Marriage and issue
Around 1199 he married at Thurrock, Essex, Isolda Bardolf (Hoo, Kent, c. 1168 - bef. 18 June 1246),by whom he had three sons: 

Sir Richard de Grey of Codnor Derbyshire, ancestor of the Barons Grey of Codnor
Sir John de Grey of Shirland Derbyshire, ancestor of the Barons Grey of Wilton and Barons Grey of Ruthyn, and through the Ruthyn Greys he was ancestor of John Grey of Groby, the first husband of Elizabeth Woodville, who later married Edward IV. In this connection, Sir John was the ancestor of the Viscounts Lisle, the Grey Marquesses of Dorset and of Lady Jane Grey. It is from Sir John's descendants the Greys of Wilton that Gray's Inn takes its name.
William de Grey of Cavendish, Suffolk, of Landford, Nottinghamshire and of Sandiacre, Derbyshire, ancestor of the Greys of Merton, Norfolk and a remote ancestor of the Barons Walsingham

After his death his widow remarried Reynold de Meurdre.

Sources
 L. G. Pine, The New Extinct Peerage 1884-1971: Containing Extinct, Abeyant, Dormant and Suspended Peerages With Genealogies and Arms (London, U.K.: Heraldry Today, 1972), p. 136.
 Charles Mosley, editor, Burke's Peerage, Baronetage & Knightage, 107th edition, 3 volumes (Wilmington, Delaware, U.S.A.: Burke's Peerage (Genealogical Books) Ltd, 2003), volume 2, p. 1665.
 G.E. Cokayne; with Vicary Gibbs, H.A. Doubleday, Geoffrey H. White, Duncan Warrand and Lord Howard de Walden, editors, The Complete Peerage of England, Scotland, Ireland, Great Britain and the United Kingdom, Extant, Extinct or Dormant, new ed., 13 volumes in 14 (1910-1959; reprint in 6 volumes, Gloucester, U.K.: Alan Sutton Publishing, 2000), volume II, p. 89.
 The Peerage of England: Containing a Genealogical and Historical Account of ...Vol. 2 By Arthur Collins

Notes

12th-century births
1219 deaths
12th-century English people
13th-century English people
Medieval English knights
People from Grays, Essex
Henry de Grey